Sohn Hak-kyu (born 22 November 1947) is a South Korean politician and the former governor of Gyeonggi-do, the most populous province in Korea. He became a politician in 1996 as a congressman of Grand National Party, and became a governor of Gyeonggi-do in 2002. He was the leader of the liberal Democratic Party. Sohn announced he was running in the 2022 presidential election as an independent candidate, but subsequently withdrew his candidacy.

A Kyunggi High School and Seoul National University graduate, he received his Ph.D. from the University of Oxford.

His daughter, Sohn Won-pyung, is a novelist.

References

1947 births
Kyunggi High School alumni
Seoul National University alumni
Living people
Liberty Korea Party politicians
United New Democratic Party politicians
Members of the National Assembly (South Korea)
Alumni of the University of Oxford
Academic staff of Sogang University
Governors of Gyeonggi Province
Health and Welfare ministers of South Korea